Waukesha West High School is one of three public high schools located in Waukesha, Wisconsin. The high school was established in 1993.

History

Email threat and subsequent evacuation 
On December 3, 2021, almost two weeks after the Waukesha Christmas parade attack, the principal received an email about a specific threat to students during the lunch period. As soon as the email threat was discovered, the school was put on a "hold" designation where students and staff remained in their classrooms, and conducted business as usual, and nobody was allowed to leave the classroom for any reason. The email threat also came on the heels of the Oxford High School Shooting in Michigan. After consultation with the Waukesha Police Department, the school was put on a "staggered evacuation" that started with students who drive, followed by students who ride the bus or get picked up by their parents. Parents had to pick up their students at St. John Neumann Catholic Church since parents weren't allowed to pick up their students on campus grounds.

In addition to the evacuation, there was also a heavy police presence at Waukesha South High School on Thursday and Friday due to physical altercations between students.

Extra-curricular activities

Academic Decathlon
Waukesha West's Academic Decathlon team won the state competition and advanced to the national competition every year between 2002 and 2012. The school placed third or better at the national competition every year between 2002 and 2009, and finished fourth in 2010.  The team was the highest-scoring Division II school each year during that time (except for 2006, when they were classified as Division I). The school has also been the national runner-up three times, finishing second to Moorpark in 2003, 2008, and 2009.

At the 2008 National Championship, Moorpark and Waukesha West achieved the two highest team scores ever recorded at any Academic Decathlon competition.

Notably, Waukesha West is the only school in the United States outside of California and Texas to have ever won the USAD National competition, which it did in 2002.

Athletics
The school's seven state championships in women's cross country are the most in state history.

State championships
Football - 2004, 2010. In 2020 the wolverines won the equivalent to a state championship but it was Referred to as a “regional championship” due to the COVID-19 pandemic and the WIAA in an ability to hold a proper state championship game.
Gymnastics- 1999, 2000, 2001, 2003, 2006, 2007, 2008
Men's cross country- 1999
Women's cross country- 1993, 1998, 1999, 2000, 2001, 2004, 2005
Women's track and field- 2000, 2004, 2005, 2006, 2018
AAAA Marching Band- 1997, 1999, 2000, 2001, 2004, 2005, 2006, 2016

Notable alumni
 Jarred Kelenic, baseball player
 Dani Rhodes, professional soccer player
 Joe Schobert, NFL football player
 Dan Solwold, professional wrestler 
 Erik Sowinski, professional runner

References

External links

Educational institutions established in 1993
Public high schools in Wisconsin
Schools in Waukesha County, Wisconsin
1993 establishments in Wisconsin